The Alamo Christian Foundation was an American cult founded in 1969 by Christian evangelist Tony Alamo and one of his wives, Susan Alamo. Susan Alamo died in April 1982. After years of legal troubles during which he was accused of engaging in abusive behavior against his followers, Alamo was convicted of ten child rape offenses in 2009. He remained in prison until his death in May 2017.

Founders
Tony Alamo (1934–2017) was born Bernie Lazar Hoffman to a Jewish family. In the 1960s, he worked in Hollywood as a pop singer under the names Mark Hoffman and Marcus Abad. Also he owned the Little Mark, Alamo, and Talamo Records record labels.

Susan Alamo (1925–1982) was born Edith Opal Horn in Alma, Arkansas. Twice married and with a daughter, she came to Hollywood and attempted to become an actress. Converting from Judaism to Christianity, she became an itinerant evangelist before she met Hoffman.

After divorcing their respective spouses, Horn and Hoffman married in a 1966 Las Vegas ceremony, legally changing their names to Tony Alamo and Susan Alamo.

History

Early years
Tony and Susan Alamo founded the Alamo Christian Foundation in 1969 in Hollywood, California. The church became the subject of controversy and as a result, it was frequently criticized for its manner of evangelization, which often involved young members of the congregation walking on the streets of Hollywood, inviting people to convert to Christianity and taking them to the church for evening services in Agua Dulce – roughly an hour away – for a meeting and a meal. Many of these individuals chose to stay on to become Bible students and lay ministers.

In 1976, the church relocated to Dyer, Arkansas, where Susan had grown up. There the church grew to several hundred members and it also established printing facilities, a school, and a tabernacle. It also operated a drug rehabilitation facility, and those who were involved in the church developed several businesses in the Alma area. As the church expanded, it established other churches in Nashville, Chicago, Brooklyn, and Miami Beach. Among the businesses which Alamo started was decorating denim jackets and airbrushing them with bright, colorful designs. Many Hollywood celebrities were seen wearing them, including Michael Jackson, who wore a modified leather Alamo jacket on the cover of his album Bad. The church's projects included Nashville's largest country and western clothing store.

The church published religious tracts and distributed tapes of sermons by the Alamos. With the assistance of some church members, the Alamos produced records and tapes. They launched a national television ministry in the 1970s.

Death of Susan Alamo
Seventeen days before her 57th birthday, Susan Alamo died of breast cancer on 8 April 1982 in Tulsa, Oklahoma, at the City of Faith hospital. In the reported belief that she would rise from the dead, her embalmed body was kept on display for six months, before it was entombed in a heart-shaped marble mausoleum on church property.

In 1991 the federal government confiscated the property, finding when its agents arrived that Susan's body had been removed. Her estranged daughter, Christhiaon Coie, brought a suit against Tony for stealing the body, and her stepfather obtained a court order requiring the body to be returned.

Tax problems and criminal proceedings
In 1982, the same year that Susan Alamo died, the foundation was discontinued and replaced by the newly incorporated Music Square Church (MSC).  MSC was granted 501c tax-exempt status in 1981, but this was retroactively revoked by the IRS on April 5, 1996.

The IRS Commissioner found that "MSC was so closely operated and controlled by and for the benefit of Tony Alamo that it enjoyed no substantive independent existence; that MSC was formed and operated by Tony Alamo for the principal purpose of willfully attempting to defeat or evade federal income tax; and that MSC was inseparable from Tony Alamo, and failed to operate for exclusively charitable purposes." MSC sued and lost in the United States Court of Federal Claims. It lost on appeal to the United States Court of Appeals in 1999.

Tony Alamo was arrested numerous times, beginning with an illegal weapons possession charge in 1966 for which he served time before he married Edith Opal Horn, and culminating in his 2009 conviction on ten counts of transporting minors as young as 9 years old across state lines for sex.
A judge granted Alamo the maximum sentence for his crimes,175 years in prison. 

In June 2013, the federal government filed forfeiture and collection actions in federal court on 27 properties which were owned by members of Tony Alamo Christian Ministries, in an attempt to collect $2.5 million in restitution that Alamo was ordered to pay to his victims. The U.S. Attorney's Office argued that the owners were "owners in name only" because the properties were still under Alamo's control.

Death of Tony Alamo
Alamo died on May 2, 2017, while he was in custody at the Federal Medical Center, Butner in Butner, North Carolina.  He was 82 years old. The Alamo Ministries posted a notice of his death on its website's homepage, but it has not posted a notice of succession nor has it stated what its future plans are.

Beliefs and practices
The church was Protestant and Pentecostal in nature and it was frequently referred to as a sect of the Jesus movement. It was also extremely anti-Catholic, it only accepted the King James Version of the Bible, and its members adhered to a moral code which condemned and forbade the use of drugs, homosexuality, adultery, birth control, and abortion. Individuals who sought to join the church and become involved in its rehabilitation program took a vow of poverty and agreed to turn all of their money and property over to the church. In return, their own needs would be met and their children would receive basic education through high school.

In popular culture
In 2016, award-winning playwright Ernest Kearney produced his one-man show My Alamo War for the Hollywood Fringe Festival in Los Angeles, California.  The show recounted his four-year struggle against the Alamo church on the streets of Hollywood.  His efforts succeeded in having the high-end jackets designed by Tony Alamo and manufactured by unpaid cult members removed from a majority of the clothing stores which were located on Hollywood Boulevard and they also succeeded in bringing the abuses of the cult to the attention of the local media.  The show was given the Fringe's Encore Producer Award.
In 2019, the American television channel Sundance TV broadcast the four-part miniseries Ministry of Evil: The Twisted Cult of Tony Alamo, based on the lives of Tony and Susan Alamo. The miniseries describes their founding and running of the Tony and Susan Alamo Christian Foundation – which the program characterizes as a "cult" – through which the Alamos became rich by exploiting their followers who truly believed in them. The program also charges Tony Alamo with being a child abuser, a polygamist and a pedophile. The documentary series also features archival footage, including Tony Alamo's videotaped deposition, as well as interviews with former members of the cult and the FBI agent who brought Alamo down.

See also
 Branch Davidians
 Christian fundamentalism
 Christian Zionism
 Christianity and homosexuality
 Christianity and Judaism
 Christianity and violence
 Fundamentalist Church of Jesus Christ of Latter-Day Saints
 Homosexuality and religion
 List of Christian denominations
 List of new religious movements
 List of organizations designated by the Southern Poverty Law Center as anti-LGBT hate groups
 List of Pentecostal and Full Gospel Churches
 Mormon fundamentalism
 Mormonism and polygamy
 Polygamy in Christianity
 Polygamy in North America
 Religious abuse
 Religious violence

References

External links
  Alamo Ministries

1969 establishments in California
1982 disestablishments in the United States
20th-century Protestantism
American members of the clergy convicted of crimes
Anti-Catholic organizations
Anti-Catholicism in the United States
Christian fundamentalism
Christian new religious movements
Christian organizations established in 1969
Criticism of the Catholic Church
Cults
Evangelicalism in the United States
Evangelical organizations
Jesus movement
King James Only movement
Pentecostal denominations in North America
Pentecostalism in Arkansas
Pentecostalism in California
Polygamy in the United States
Protestantism in Arkansas
Protestantism in California
Religious tract publishing companies
Christian organizations disestablished in 1982